Tongchuan is a district of the city of Dazhou, Sichuan Province, China.

Districts of Sichuan
Dazhou